The phrase "every child is special"  may refer to:

Taare Zameen Par, a Hindi film
a slogan of Easter Seals
a monologue on the album It's Bad for Ya by comedian George Carlin